Kathleen "Kate" Miller is an American actress and voice over artist. She plays the role of DA Amanda Shaw in the television series Hightown and Vivian Abetemarco on Blue Bloods. Her Broadway career includes roles in Moon Over Buffalo and Amadeus. Her voice over work includes the animated series Sealab 2021, Frisky Dingo and Dora the Explorer as well as the video games God of War Ragnarök, Gotham Knights, and the Guild Wars franchise.

Biography 
Miller was born in Cincinnati, Ohio and grew up in West Virginia. She attended an apprenticeship at summer stock theater before returning to finish high school at Interlochen Arts Academy. She later moved to San Diego where she obtained her BFA in theater.
 
Miller moved to New York City to work on Broadway. She made her first Broadway appearance in the original production of Moon Over Buffalo alongside Carol Burnett, and played opposite Michael Sheen in the revival production of Amadeus shortly thereafter.
 
Throughout her career she played in numerous television shows and films, including Hightown, Blue Bloods, |The Trial of the Chicago 7, and Law & Order. She has also done voice over work for video games such as Gotham Knights and God of War Ragnarök as well as the shows Frisky Dingo and Dora the Explorer.Her most recent voice role is in  Miller also voiced the character Debbie DuPree on the Adult Swim show Sealab 2021, one of the segment's first ever original shows.

Filmography

Theater

Film and television

Voice over

Personal life
 
She has been married to actor John DiMaggio since 2014 and lives and works in both Los Angeles and New York City.

References

External links 
 
 Official website
 Kate Miller at IMDb

1969 births
Living people
American actresses
American voice actresses